Mississippi Highway 13 (MS 13) is a state highway in Mississippi.

Route description

MS 13 begins in southern Forrest County at an intersection with US 49 just south of Maxie. It heads west as a two-lane highway through farmland, then wooded areas, for several miles, where it passes through Carnes. The highway now crosses into Pearl River County.

MS 13 continues traveling westward through rural areas, where it passes through Young and has an interchange with I-59 (Exit 41), before crossing into Lamar County and immediately entering Lumberton. The highway widens to a four-lane divided highway as it passes straight through the center of town along Main Avenue, having an intersection with US 11 directly in the center of downtown. MS 13 now narrows back to two-lanes and leaves Lumberton, passing by the city's airport and through the community of Wells Town. The highway winds its way northwest through mostly wooded areas for the next several miles, passing through Baxterville before crossing into Marion County.

MS 13 passes through woodlands for more miles before curving more northward at an intersection with MS 43 and starts paralleling the Pearl River. The highway now enters the Columbia city limits and passes by a few businesses and homes before having an intersection and becoming concurrent (overlapped) with US 98 just south of downtown, with the road continuing into downtown as Lumberton Road. They head west as a four-lane divided highway through a business district to have an intersection with MS 198 before crossing the Pearl River to leave Columbia and enter neighboring Foxworth. MS 13 splits off of US 98 and heads north along MS 35 to bypass downtown as a two-lane along its eastern side before leaving Foxworth and crossing another bridge over the river back into Columbia. MS 13/MS 35 pass through mostly neighborhoods for a few miles before MS 13 splits off to leave Columbia for the final time and head north. MS 13 travels through mostly woodlands for the next several miles to pass through Goss, where it has an intersection with MS 44, before crossing into Jefferson Davis County.

MS 13 passes through Society Hill, where it has another intersection with MS 43, before pulling away from the Pearl River and passing through mostly remote woodlands for several more miles to enter Prentiss, where it passes by a few homes and businesses before coming to an intersection and becoming concurrent with MS 184. MS 13/MS 184 bypass downtown along US 84's original bypass of the town, first passing through a business district as a four-lane divided Highway (where it has an intersection with MS 42), then as a two-lane through more rural areas (where MS 184 splits off). MS 13 heads north to have an interchange with US 84's new bypass of Prentiss before leaving the town and traveling northward through an even mix of rural farmland and wooded areas for several miles to cross into Simpson County.

MS 13 travels through rural areas for several miles, having intersections with MS 28 and yet another one with MS 43, before passing through Mendenhall, where it has interchanges with MS 149 (unsigned MS 540) and US 49 as it bypasses downtown along its west side. The highway now leaves Mendenhall and travels through rural areas, where it crosses the Strong River, before entering Rankin County.

MS 13 travels through the southeastern most corner of the county, passing through Puckett (where it has an intersection with MS 18), before entering Smith County. The highway winds its way northeast as it passes through Daniel (where it has an intersection with MS 541) and Polkville before entering Scott County.

MS 13 heads north through wooded areas (part of the Bienville National Forest) for several miles, where it passes through Kracker Station, before having an interchange with I-20 (Exit 77) and entering Morton. The highway passes through mostly neighborhoods, passing by Roosevelt State Park, and having an intersection with US 80  and a short concurrency with MS 481 on the west side of downtown. MS 13 now leaves Morton and passes through remote woodlands for the next several miles, with the only sign of civilization being the small community of Forkville, where it has an intersection with MS 483. It now crosses into Leake County.

MS 13 travels through farmland as it passes through Lena, where it has intersections with MS 500 and MS 487, before continuing through rural to come to an end at an intersection with MS 25 just southwest of Carthage, back along the banks of the Pearl River.

History

MS 13W

MS 13 was originally designated in 1932. It had at one time, designated in 1941, a spur route, Mississippi Highway 13W (MS 13W), which represented what is now MS 35 south of Columbia. It was eventually became renumbered as a southern extension of MS 35.

Columbia rerouting

MS 13 did not originally bypass downtown Columbia as it does today. It originally entered the city from the south as Lumberton Road before becoming concurrent with MS 198/MS 35 (S High School Avenue; then part of US 98). They headed north along High School Avenue past some businesses and neighborhoods before coming to an intersection with Broad Street. MS 198 heads east (right) along Broad Street while MS 13/MS 35 headed west (left) along Broad Street to enter downtown. MS 13/MS 35 now curved northward (right) onto Main Street at the Marion County Courthouse and then passed through the downtown area. The highway then left downtown and passed through neighborhoods, where MS 35 had split off (right) onto W Lafayette Street (then Martin Luther King Jr. Drive), and continued north on Main Street through an industrial area before leaving Columbia and heading north towards Prentiss. This entire alignment was composed of two-lane streets and never crossed a bridge over the Pearl River.

Major intersections

References

External links

Magnolia Meanderings

013
Transportation in Forrest County, Mississippi
Transportation in Pearl River County, Mississippi
Transportation in Lamar County, Mississippi
Transportation in Marion County, Mississippi
Transportation in Jefferson Davis County, Mississippi
Transportation in Simpson County, Mississippi
Transportation in Rankin County, Mississippi
Transportation in Smith County, Mississippi
Transportation in Scott County, Mississippi
Transportation in Leake County, Mississippi